"Love Fever" is a song by American singer Gayle Adams. It was released in 1981 by Prelude Records. It was remixed by François Kevorkian.

"Love Fever" peaked at #24 on the Billboard Black Singles and #7 on the Dance chart. By end of January 1982, the position was number 9.

Track listing

1981 release  
7" vinyl
 US: Prelude / PRL 8040

Personnel 
Mixing, editing: Francois Kevorkian
Producer: Rodney Brown, Willie Lester

Chart performance

References 

1981 singles
1981 songs